William Joseph Nagle (May 9, 1885 – April 10, 1970) was an American figure skater who competed in men's singles. He finished eighth at the World Figure Skating Championships in 1930 and eleventh at the 1932 Winter Olympics. He won the bronze medal at the United States Figure Skating Championships in 1937, 1941, and 1943, all after his 50th birthday. He was born in Jersey City, New Jersey.

References

Sports-reference profile

1885 births
1970 deaths
American male single skaters
Olympic figure skaters of the United States
Figure skaters at the 1932 Winter Olympics
Sportspeople from Jersey City, New Jersey